Sir Hugh Hill, 1st Baronet (1 January 1727 – 10 February 1795) was an Anglo-Irish politician. 

Hill was High Sheriff of Londonderry City from 1751 to 1753. He was the Member of Parliament for Londonderry City in the Irish House of Commons between 1768 and his death in 1795. On 17 August 1779 he was made a baronet, of Brook Hall in the Baronetage of Ireland. Hill married Hannah McClintock and was succeeded in his title by his son, George Hill.

References

1727 births
1795 deaths
18th-century Anglo-Irish people
Baronets in the Baronetage of Ireland
High Sheriffs of Londonderry City
Irish MPs 1761–1768
Irish MPs 1769–1776
Irish MPs 1776–1783
Irish MPs 1783–1790
Irish MPs 1790–1797
Members of the Parliament of Ireland (pre-1801) for County Londonderry constituencies